Mads Lauritsen (born 14 April 1993) is a Danish professional footballer who plays as a centre-back for Danish Superliga club Viborg FF.

Career
On 24 August 2020 it was confirmed, that Lauritsen had returned to Viborg FF on a loan deal until the end of the season. On 22 February 2021, he signed a permanent deal with Viborg until June 2022.

Honours
Viborg
Danish 1st Division: 2020–21

References

External links

1993 births
Living people
Danish men's footballers
Holstebro BK players
Viborg FF players
Thisted FC players
Vejle Boldklub players
Danish Superliga players
Danish 1st Division players
Danish 2nd Division players
Association football defenders
People from Holstebro
Sportspeople from the Central Denmark Region